The siege of Darwar was a twenty-nine-week siege of the fort at Dharwad in 1790 and 1791, then near the frontier, between the Kingdom of Mysore and the Maratha Empire.  The Marathas, assisted by forces of the British East India Company, began the siege on 18 September 1790 and resulted with the surrender of Mysore garrison on 3 April 1791.

References

Moor, Edward (1794). A narrative of the operations of captain Little's detachment, and of the Mahratta army (a detailed British account of the siege)
Mill, James. A history of British India, Volume 5
Duff, James Grant. A history of the Mahrattas, Volume 2

Darwad
Darwad
Darwad 1790
Darwad 1790
Darwad 1790
Darwad 1790